This is a list of awards and nominations received by American actress Aunjanue Ellis.

A popular actress in numerous US television series and films in the late 1990s and early 2000s, Ellis gained international notoriety by starring in the film Ray (2004) directed by Taylor Hackford, for which she was nominated at the Screen Actors Guild Award for Outstanding Performance by a Cast in a Motion Picture. Later Ellis acted in severals television critical acclaimed television series, including E-Ring, Justice, True Blood and The Mentalist.

After being cast in Academy Awards nominated film The Help, Ellis played Ann Pettway in television film Abducted: The Carlina White Story, winning the Black Reel Awards for Outstanding Actress, TV Movie/Limited Series. In 2014, she played the lead role in the film Of Mind and Music, receiving critical acclaim winning the American Black Film Festival Award for Best Actress.

In 2016, after taking part in Nate Parker's film The Birth of a Nation, Ellis starred in the drama miniseries The Book of Negroes. Her role was critically acclaimed, earning her nominations at the Critics' Choice Television Awards, NAACP Image Awards and Satellite Awards for Best Actress, winning the Canadian Screen Awards in the same category. Following Ellis starred in Barry Jenkins' Academy Awards-nominated film If Beale Street Could Talk (2018), receiving critical acclaim for her performance with the cast.

In 2019 Ellis played as Sharonne Salaam in the miniseries When They See Us, earning a nomination at Primetime Emmy Award for Outstanding Lead Actress in a Limited or Anthology Series or Movie. In 2020 she starred as Mattie Moss Clark in television film The Clark Sisters: First Ladies of Gospel and as Hippolyta Freeman in HBO serie Lovecraft Country, being nominated at the Primetime Emmy Award for Outstanding Supporting Actress in a Drama Series and Screen Actors Guild Award for Outstanding Performance by an Ensemble in a Drama Series.

In 2021 Ellis starred as Oracene "Brandy" Price critically acclaimed film King Richard, role that earned her her first nominations at the Golden Globe Award for Best Supporting Actress – Motion Picture and at the Academy Awards in the same category. Ellis was also awarded by the National Board of Review for Best Supporting Actress.

Major associations

Academy Awards

British Academy Film Awards

Golden Globe Awards

Primetime Emmy Awards

Screen Actors Guild Awards

Other awards

Black Reel Awards

Canadian Screen Awards

Critics' Choice Movie Awards

Critics' Choice Television Awards

NAACP Image Awards

National Board of Review

Satellite Awards

Critic's awards

References

External links
  

Lists of awards received by American actor
Ellis